Trichopteryx veritata is a species of geometrid moth in the family Geometridae. It is found in North America.

The MONA or Hodges number for Trichopteryx veritata is 7636.

References

Further reading

 
 

Trichopterygini
Articles created by Qbugbot
Moths described in 1907